A list of films produced in France in 1920:

See also
 1920 in France

References

External links
 French films of 1920 at the Internet Movie Database
French films of 1920 at Cinema-francais.fr

1920
Lists of 1920 films by country or language
Films